Fish Street may refer to:
St Aldate's, Oxford
North Street (Boston)